Carlos Calderon is a retired boxer from Puerto Rico who competed at the 1976 Summer Olympics.

1976 Olympic record
Below is the Olympic record of Carlos Calderon, a Puerto Rican featherweight boxer who competed at the 1976 Montreal Olympics:

 Round of 64: defeated Boukary Assakande (Burkina Faso) by walkover
 Round of 32: lost to Angel Pacheco (Venezuela) by decision, 0-5

References

1955 births
Living people
Boxers at the 1976 Summer Olympics
Olympic boxers of Puerto Rico
Puerto Rican male boxers
Boxers at the 1975 Pan American Games
Pan American Games bronze medalists for Puerto Rico
Pan American Games medalists in boxing
Featherweight boxers
Medalists at the 1975 Pan American Games
20th-century Puerto Rican people